Eurotower is a high-rise building in Zagreb, Croatia, located in Trnje at the intersection of the Vukovarska and Lučićeva streets, in the southwest corner. It was built in 2006.

Eurotower is currently best known as the headquarters of the Zagreb Stock Exchange and KPMG in Croatia.
The architect is Marijan Hržić, who is also the designer of the Cibona Tower in Zagreb.

Views of Eurotower

See also 
 List of tallest buildings in Croatia

External links 

Eurotower on Emporis
 

Buildings and structures in Zagreb
Office buildings completed in 2006
2006 establishments in Croatia
Skyscraper office buildings in Croatia